Marcel Kandziora (born 4 February 1990) is a German footballer.

References

External links

1990 births
Living people
German footballers
Borussia Dortmund II players
SV Sandhausen players
FSV Frankfurt players
VfL Osnabrück players
North Carolina FC players
2. Bundesliga players
3. Liga players
North American Soccer League players
Sportspeople from Münster
Association football midfielders
Footballers from North Rhine-Westphalia